Hobbieville is an unincorporated community in Center Township, Greene County, Indiana.

History
Hobbieville was originally called Jonesboro, and under the latter name was founded in 1837. A post office was established as Hobbieville in 1840, and it remained in operation until it was discontinued in 1935.

Geography

References

Unincorporated communities in Greene County, Indiana
Unincorporated communities in Indiana
Bloomington metropolitan area, Indiana